"All I Know" is a song by the American alternative rock group Screaming Trees. It is the first single released in support of their seventh album, Dust. The opening echoes "Flying" while the guitar solo lifts from "Do You Feel Like We Do".

Formats and track listing 
UK CD single (658918 2)
"All I Know" (Gary Lee Conner, Van Conner, Mark Lanegan) – 3:55
"Wasted Time" (Gary Lee Conner, Van Conner, Mark Lanegan, Barrett Martin) – 3:52
"Silver Tongue" (Gary Lee Conner, Van Conner, Mark Lanegan, Barrett Martin) – 6:06

Charts

Personnel
Adapted from the All I Know liner notes.

Screaming Trees
 Gary Lee Conner – acoustic guitar, electric guitar, backing vocals
 Van Conner – bass guitar, backing vocals
 Mark Lanegan – lead vocals
 Barrett Martin – drums, percussion

Production and additional personnel
 George Drakoulias – production
 Andy Wallace – mixing
 Howie Weinberg – mastering

Release history

References

External links 
 

1996 songs
1996 singles
Screaming Trees songs
Songs written by Gary Lee Conner
Songs written by Van Conner
Songs written by Mark Lanegan
Epic Records singles